Badi Maa  (Elder Mother), also called Bari-Ma, is a Bollywood social war drama film. Released in 1945, it was produced and directed by Master Vinayak. Made under the banner of Prafulla Pictures, Kolhapur, it had story written by V. S. Khendekar. Zia Sarhadi wrote the screenplay and lyrics for six songs. The other lyricists were Anjum Pilibhiti and Raja Badhe. The music director was K. Datta (Datta Koregaonkar).

The film starred Noor Jehan, Ishwarlal, Yakub, Sitara Devi, Meenaxi, Baby Alka, Damuanna Malvankar, Leela Mishra and Girish. It had playback singer Lata Mangeshkar in one of her rare early acting roles, performing alongside Noor Jehan. Besides Mangeshkar, the film also had singer Asha Bhosle in a minor role with the other two singers.

Made at the end of WWII, the film factors the Japanese involvement, with Yakub and Sitara Devi acting as spies for Japan. The lead pair, Ishwarlal and Noor Jehan take them on, emerging victorious.

Plot
Set against the backdrop of WW II, it has the hero Dinesh, played by Ishwarlal, stuck in London during the Blitz. Dinesh's father Durgadas (D. S. Salvi) lives in a village (Dinapur) in India, with his daughter Usha (Meenaxi). Durgadas owes money to Ghanshyam (Girish), a money-lender with two children. Ghanshyam's son Rajinder (Yakub), is a spy for the Japanese and is helped by a dancer called Mona (Sitara Devi). His daughter Hema (Noor Jehan) is a compassionate, patriotic girl unaware of her brother's plans and is in love with Dinesh.

Ghanshyam offers to free Durgadas of his debt if he will agree to his daughter's marriage to Rajinder. When Durgadas refuses, Ghanshyam has his property confiscated. Dinesh returns to India and is shocked to find his father in penury and an attack on his village by the Japanese. He takes up arms to fight and is joined by Hema. His sister Usha dies under enemy firing, and a repentant Rajinder fights the enemy dying in the bargain. Hema and Dinesh survive the war having fought for Badi Maa (India), and get together.

Cast
 Noor Jehan as Hema
 Ishwarlal as Dinesh
 Yakub as Rajinder
 Sitara as Mona, Rajinder's partner in spying
 Meenaxi as Usha, Dinesh's sister
 D. S. Salvi as Durgadas, Dinesh's father
 Girish as Ghanshyam, Hema and Rajinder's father
 Lata Mangeshkar
 Asha Bhosle in a minor role
 Baby Alka

Review
Filmindia, with its newly formed rating system of one to five stars with one being Rotten, Avoid and five being Excellent, Don't miss, gave the film a one star rating. In its September 1945 issue, it panned the film terming it a "propaganda social"  and claiming the film to be "the year's most rotten show".

Though the film came in for criticism for being a propaganda film, made "under the constant goading of the Information Department", it was a commercial success at the box-office, becoming the third highest grossing Indian film of that year.

Soundtrack
The music was composed by K. Datta with the songs written by three lyricists. Zia Sarhadi wrote the lyrics for six of the ten songs in the film, Anjum Pilibhiti three songs, and Raja Badhe one song. The singers were Noor Jehan, Baby Alka, Lata Mangeshkar and Ishwarlal.

Song List

References

External links
 
 Badi Maa on indiancine.ma

1945 films
1940s Hindi-language films
Indian war drama films
1940s war drama films
Indian black-and-white films
1945 drama films